The Sydney Swans are a professional Australian rules football club based in Sydney, New South Wales. The men's team competes in the Australian Football League (AFL), and the women's team in the AFL Women's (AFLW). The Swans also field a reserves men's team in the Victorian Football League (VFL).

The club's origins trace back to March 21, 1873, when a meeting was held at the Clarendon Hotel in South Melbourne to establishing a junior football club, to be called the South Melbourne Football Club. The club commenced playing in 1874 at its home ground; Lakeside Oval in Albert Park. Playing as South Melbourne, it participated in the Victorian Football Association (VFA) competition from 1878 before joining the breakaway Victorian Football League (VFL) as a founding member in 1897. Originally known as the "Bloods" in reference to the red colour used on players' guernseys, the Swan emblem was adopted in 1933 after a journalist at the time referred to them using the moniker following a large influx of Western Australian players. In 1982, it became the first professional Australian football club to permanently relocate interstate (from Victoria to New South Wales). In the following year, the club was renamed the Sydney Swans.

The club has a rivalry with the Greater Western Sydney Giants, with whom they contest the Sydney Derby. Their headquarters and training facilities are located in the Moore Park sporting precinct, with offices and indoor training at the Royal Hall of Industries and outdoor sessions conducted on the adjacent Tramway Oval and Sydney Cricket Ground, the latter being the site of the club's senior men's team home matches since 1982. The Swans have won five VFL/AFL premierships including 1909, 1918, and 1933, before experiencing a 72-year premiership drought—the longest of any team in the competition's history. This premiership drought ended with the 2005 premiership, which was later followed by another title in 2012. They won five times and lost twelve grand finals.

According to Roy Morgan, the Swans are one of the most supported clubs in the AFL with more than a million fans in 2021.

History

Origins: 1873–1876
The club's origins trace back to 21 March 1873, when a meeting was held at the Clarendon Hotel in South Melbourne for the purpose of establishing a junior football club, to be called the South Melbourne Football Club.

The inauguration date of the club is officially 19 June 1874. It was first known as "Cecil Football Club" (after Cecil Street, South Melbourne, one of the early thoroughfares), but adopted the name "South Melbourne Football Club" four weeks later on 15 July. The club was based at Lake Oval alongside the lake in Albert Park, also home of the South Melbourne Cricket Club.

While one of the early favourites to win, South Melbourne were a notable exclusion from the Challenge Cup competitions of the 1870s with entry to this competition strictly limited to clubs playing under the Melbourne Football Club's rules. The club's lack of adherence to the Victorian Rules (and insistence on playing by its own rules) resulted in some controversial early wins. This, along with ability to regularly field a full senior team, may have contributed to its absence during the football season competition begun in the 1870s. Throughout this period South Melbourne, along with neighbouring Cup member club Albert Park, had experimented with rugby football rules which in May 1874 had advocated strongly for their widespread adoption in Victoria, however this did not meet favour with the more powerful clubs in the colony.

Despite not being part of the big league of clubs, South Melbourne by the mid-1870s is recorded to have enough senior players to field two teams of twenty and played matches against non-Cup clubs during this time against nearby clubs including Fawkner Park, Elwood, West Melbourne, Southern Rifles in 1875 and Sandridge Alma, St Kilda Alma, Victoria Parade, and Williamstown in 1876 among others. Many of this group of clubs most of which had primarily juniors had also begun to discuss starting their own cup competition.

South was one of Victoria's most prolific touring clubs. Seeking more regular senior competition in 1876 South Melbourne also went on one of its first regional tours playing against newly formed clubs at Beechworth, Blackwood, Taradale and Ballarat.

VFA era: 1877–1896

South Melbourne was a junior foundation club of the Victorian Football Association in 1877, and attained senior status in 1879.

Amalgamation with Albert Park
In 1880, South Melbourne amalgamated with the nearby Albert-park Football Club, which had a senior football history dating back to May 1867 (Albert-park had, in fact, been known as South Melbourne during its first year of existence). Following the amalgamation, the club retained the name South Melbourne, and adopted the club's now familiar red and white colours from Albert-park. Nicknamed the "Southerners", the team was more colourfully known as the "Bloods", in reference to the bright red diagonal sash on their white jumpers (the sash was replaced with a red "V" in 1932). The colourful epithet the "Bloodstained Angels" was also in use. Following the 1880 amalgamation it became the strongest in metropolitan Melbourne.

VFA success
Over its first decade as an amalgamated club, South Melbourne won five VFA premierships – in 1881, 1885 (undefeated) and three-in-a-row in 1888, 1889 and 1890 – and was runner-up to the provincial Geelong Football Club in 1880, 1883 and 1886. The 1886 season was notable for its 4 September match against Geelong, which generated unprecedented public interest as both clubs had entered the match undefeated.

The club was the second Victorian club to visit New South Wales in 1883 travelling to Newcastle where it also defeated the Northern Districts League by a goal before travelling to Sydney where it defeated Sydney by just a single goal in front of a large crowd at the Sydney Cricket Ground and  East Sydney Football Club by a goal in front of 600 spectators.

At the end of the 1896 season, Collingwood and South Melbourne finished equal at the top of the VFA's premiership ladder with records of 14–3–1, requiring a playoff match to determine the season's premiership; this was the first time this had occurred in VFA history. The match took place on 3 October 1896 at the East Melbourne Cricket Ground. Collingwood won the match, six goals to five, in front of an estimated crowd of 12,000.

This grand final would be the last match South Melbourne would play in the VFA, as the following season they would be one of eight founding clubs forming the breakaway Victorian Football League joining St Kilda, Essendon, Fitzroy, Melbourne, Geelong, Carlton and Collingwood.

VFL entry: 1897–1909

South Melbourne was one of the original founding clubs of the Victorian Football League that was formed in 1897.

Premiership success: 1909–1945

The club had early success and won three VFL premierships in 1909, 1918 and 1933. The club was at its most successful in the 1930s, when key recruits from both Victoria and interstate led to a string of appearances in the finals, including four successive grand final appearances from 1933 to 1936, albeit with only one premiership in 1933.  The collection of players recruited from interstate in 1932/1933 became known as South Melbourne's "Foreign Legion".

On grand final eve, 1935, as the Swans prepared to take on Collingwood, star full-forward Bob Pratt was clipped by a truck moments after stepping off a tram and subsequently missed the match for South. Ironically, the truck driver was a South Melbourne supporter.

It was during this period that the team became known as the Swans. The nickname, which was suggested by a Herald and Weekly Times artist in 1933, was inspired by the number of Western Australians in the team (the black swan being the state emblem of Western Australia), and was formally adopted by the club before the following season 1934. The name stuck, in part due to the club's association with nearby Albert Park and Lake, also known for its swans (although there are no longer any non-native white swans and only black, indigenous swans in the lake).

After several years with only limited success, South Melbourne next reached the grand final in 1945. The match, played against Carlton, was to become known colloquially as "the Bloodbath", due to the player brawl that overshadowed the match, with a total of 9 players being reported by the umpires. Carlton won the match by 28 points, and from then on, South Melbourne struggled for many years.

Struggling times: 1946–1981

Following the end of the second world war, South Melbourne consistently struggled, as their traditional inner-city recruiting district largely emptied as a result of demographic shifts. The club missed the finals in 1946 and continued to fall such that by 1950 they were second-last on the ladder. They narrowly missed the finals in 1952, but from 1953 to 1969, they never finished any higher than eighth on the ladder. By the 1960s it was clear that South Melbourne's financial resources would not be capable of allowing them to compete in the growing market for country and interstate players, and their own local zone was never strong enough to compensate for this. The introduction of country zoning failed to help, as the Riverina Football League proved to be one of the least profitable zones.

Between 1945 and 1981, South Melbourne made the finals only twice: under legendary coach Norm Smith, South Melbourne finished fourth in 1970, but lost the first semi-final; and, in 1977, the club finished fifth under coach Ian Stewart, but lost the elimination final. In that time, they "won" three wooden spoons. Between Round 7, 1972 and Round 13, 1973, the team lost 29 consecutive games. By the end of the 1970s South Melbourne were saddled with massive debts after struggling for such a long period of time.

A VFL club for Sydney

The VFL had been actively seeking an audience in Sydney since its first exhibition match in 1903 drew 20,000 people. For more than three quarters of a century, it had strategically scheduled matches in Sydney and through the Australian National Football Council - had allocated a significant share of its marketing budget to developing the code in Sydney, showcasing interstate tournaments and encouraging its clubs to play against the state representative side. At one point, it even attempted to negotiate a hybrid code with rugby league. However interest in the code in Sydney remained the poorest in the country (where it was behind three other football codes). In the late 1970s, however, with increasing professionalism of the sport there was an overall increase in national interest in the VFL competition. In 1979 the financially struggling Fitzroy Lions conducted a feasibility into the possibility of moving to North Sydney and a proposal was put forward, but was voted down by its board in 1980. The VFL scheduled 2 premiership matches for the Sydney Cricket Ground in 1979. One of them, between the previous year's grand finalists North Melbourne and Hawthorn drew a record 31,395 to the gates. To test the market further, the VFL scheduled 4 matches for the SCG in 1980 with an average attendance of 19,000. In April 1980, the VFL stated that its market study showed there was sufficient support for a Sydney team, finding that there was an increase in television ratings in Sydney and sustained attendance at matches and that it intended to have a team in Sydney, possibly as soon as 1982. A 1981 report by Graham Huggins concluded that there was an "untapped market in Sydney which represented an excellent opportunity for the league." The report claimed that 60,000 people in Sydney had stated that they would regularly support the new club and 90% of these supporters would watch VFL on television from Sydney and 80% of these supporters had not attended rugby and 92% believed that Australian rules could become popular in Sydney.
In 1981 the VFL had decided that it would establish an entirely new 13th VFL club in Sydney along with a possible 14th team. The VFL was under strong pressure from interests in Adelaide to admit a South Australian club and from the ACT for a new Canberra license, however VFL president Allan Aylett was convinced that Sydney was the most viable option.

In 1981, Canberra's ACTAFL had edged out rugby league in popularity with an increase in participation it had become the number one sport. Under significant pressure from a rugby league junior development push and fearing the impact on its strong local competition of entry of a Sydney team made a formal bid for license to enter a Canberra team into the VFL. With corporate backing and strong public support including local legend Alex Jesaulenko, the Canberra bid was confident it would be a successful expansion club. Aylett however, determined to pursue the entry of a Sydney team, dismissed the Canberra bid publishing a scathing report on the development of football in the ACT, stating that the VFL might consider Canberra for a license in another 10 years. Aylett's view was that Sydney offered a much bigger television audience and the most potential to add to the league's lucrative television rights. The report however was criticised by the ACTAFL as a template for the NSW Rugby League to raid the prime Canberra market, which it did successfully, the following year. Not only did the VFL's Sydney plan and the Canberra Raiders decimate the ACTAFL's popularity and increase the popularity of rugby league throughout New South Wales, but to later bail out the struggling Swans and without consulting the ACTAFL, designated it an exclusive recruitment zone, taking with it many of the league's best players.

With the possibility of another club making Sydney a viable move, in 1981, the South Melbourne board, recognising the structural difficulties it faced with long-term viability and financial stability in Melbourne, decided not to miss what it saw as a strategic opportunity to capture an untapped market and save its club. The board made the decision to play all 1982 home games in Sydney. The club had been operating at a loss of at least $150,000 for the previous five years. News of the proposal broke on 2 July 1981, after which a letter was sent to members justifying the board's reasons for making the proposal and noting that the coach and current players were in favour of the move. On 29 July 1981, the VFL formally accepted the proposal, and paved the way for the Swans to shift to Sydney in 1982.

Inevitably, the move caused very great internal difficulties as a large supporters' group known as Keep South at South campaigned against the move throughout the rest of 1981; and, at an extraordinary general meeting on 22 September, the group democratically won control of the club's board. However, the new board did not have the power to unilaterally stop the move to Sydney: under the VFL constitution, to rescind the decision that had been made on 29 July required a three-quarters majority in a vote  of all twelve clubs, and at a meeting on 14 October it failed to obtain this majority. The new board, whilst representative of most fans, lacked the support of the players, many of whom were in favour of a long-term move to Sydney; in early November, after the board promised that it would try to bring the club back to Melbourne in 1983, the players went on strike, seeking to force the new board to commit to Sydney in the long term as well as seeking payments that the cash-strapped club owed them from the previous season. The board ended up undermining its own position when it accepted a $400,000 loan from the VFL in late November in order to stay solvent, under the condition that it commit to Sydney for at least two years. Finally, in early December, the Keep South at South board resigned and a board in favour of the move to Sydney was installed.

Swans move to Sydney: 1982–1984
In 1982, the club was still technically a Melbourne-based club which played all of its home games at the Sydney Cricket Ground. Its physical "home club" was the "Southern Cross Social Club" at 120a Clovelly Road, Randwick In response to the move, the club's sponsors, Bond Corporation pulled out and the club was left without a major backer. At a major launch in Sydney, Aylett vindicated the league's decision, announcing it had signed a new sponsor, Ward Transport, and that on-field success for the Swans would soon follow. The Swans experienced success in the 1982 Escort Championships with 1,000 supporters packing out the Chevron Hotel ballroom in King Cross in response to the win, however Channel Seven did not broadcast the match in Sydney. The lack of televised games and any media interest in Sydney was to continue to plague support for the Swans.

The club won their first official Sydney home game against Melbourne in front of 15,764. 

In June 1982, it dropped the name "South Melbourne", officially becoming "the Swans" for the rest of the season. The name change, however, did not endear either the Sydney media or the Sydney public, and after successive games at home, began to draw as few as 10,000. Despite just missing the finals, and some good wins at home and respectable home crowds against league leaders Carlton and Richmond, the lack of success and cold reception in Sydney lead to the lustre quickly leaving the league's glamour team.

In 1983 average crowds in Sydney continued to plummet to 12,000 and Swans supporter packages dropped to as low as 100 members. Television ratings and sponsorship revenue in Sydney were also far below the league's expectations. 

The financial impact continued to drown the Swans in 1984, with the club flagging pay cuts to its players in order to survive. Coach Ricky Quade resigned and caretaker coach Bob Hammond, despite showing some promise, was unable to turn the club's poor performance around. In order to keep the club solvent during this time, the VFL began to write loans to the Swans that the club would have been unable to pay off on its own. The Swans were the league's most reliant on sponsorship and subsidies from the VFL to stay solvent and meet player payments due to its continued poor crowds, public apathy and poor TV ratings.

Public support for the Swans in Sydney was so bad that by the start of the 1985 season, the VFL began to backflip and the league's administrators, having sunk large amounts of money into the club began looking to offload it.

Edelston era and privatisation: 1985-1987 
On 31 July 1985, for what was thought to be $6.3 million, Geoffrey Edelsten "bought" the Swans; in reality it was $2.9 million in cash with funding and other payments spread over five years. Edelsten resigned as chairman in less than twelve months, but had already made his mark. He immediately recruited former Geelong coach Tom Hafey. Hafey, in turn, used his knowledge of Geelong's contracts to recruit David Bolton, Bernard Toohey and Greg Williams, who would all form a key part of the Sydney side, at a league-determined total fee of $240,000 (less than the $500,000 Geelong demanded and even the $300,000 Sydney offered). The likes of Gerard Healy, Merv Neagle and Paul Morwood were also poached from other clubs, and failed approaches were made to Simon Madden, Terry Daniher, Andrew Bews and Maurice Rioli.

During the Edelsten years, the Swans were seen by the Sydney public as a flamboyant, flashy club, typified by the style of its spearhead, Warwick Capper, his long bright blond mullet and bright pink boots made him unmissable on the field and his pink Lamborghini, penchant for girlfriends who were fashion models and his general showy eccentricity made him notorious off the field – all somewhat fashionable in the 1980s. During Capper's peak years, the Swans had made successive finals appearances for the first time since relocating. His consistently spectacular aerial exploits earned him the Mark of the Year award in 1987 while his goalkicking efforts (amassing 103 goals in 1987) made him runner up in the Coleman Medal two years running. The Swans’ successive finals appearances saw crowds during this time peak at an average of around 25,000 per game. Edelsten also introduced the "Swanettes", becoming the sole such American-style cheerleading group among VFL teams following the disbandment of Carlton's Blue Birds in 1986. The Swanettes did not get much performance time, owing to the short intervals between quarters of play in the VFL and the lack of space in which they might perform while other activities take place on the field. The Swanettes were rapidly discontinued. During the Edelsten era, the club's owner and the private company Westec are reported to have sunk more than $10 million in additional private capital to keep the club afloat.

When the Southern Cross club went bankrupt in 1987, the club relocated to the newly built Sydney Football Stadium

In 1987, the Swans scored 201 points against the West Coast Eagles and the following week scored 236 points against the Essendon Football Club. Both games were at the SCG. The Swans remain one of only two clubs to have scored consecutive team tallies above 200 points, the only other being Geelong in 1992. However, this was followed by several heavy losses, including defeat by Hawthorn by 99 points in the Qualifying Final and by 76 points against Melbourne in the First Semi-final.

Dark times: 1988–1994
The club's form was to slump in the following year. Losses were in the millions. It was obvious to most that the Swans were struggling financially, though the owners Powerplay International Ltd were not selling. In early 1988 the company advised the Australian Stock Exchange to cease trading its shares as it could not continue to trade until it had offloaded the Swans. A Canberra consortium including the ACTAFL initially proposed to buy the failed club and shift it to Canberra, however the VFL claimed this was too extreme a move. The league compromised and along with Aylett, who had denied Canberra a license in 1981, proposed that the Swans play away games in the ACT with a dual aim of giving the club a sustainable supporter base and helping resurrect the code in the ACT which had lost enormous ground to rugby league since the introduction of the Canberra Raiders. However the VFL blocked the move feeling that the club would lose its identity if it were to play matches in Canberra.

By mid year the VFL had revoked the Swans license and took over ownership of the club, after an investigation under VFL CEO Ross Oakley determined that it was unable to continue operating. However, there were no buyers. On 6 May 1988 the VFL paid Powerplay just $10 to transfer ownership of the club in an attempt to keep it afloat until a buyer could be found. The VFL would wait months for the club to regain financial security. The VFL had reported that it needed to find a buyer willing to pay at least $4 million in order to make the club financially viable in the medium to long term. In the meantime, the league had secured a sponsor which helped underwrite the club until the sale.

At the end of 1988 the VFL re-tendered the Swans license and a group of financial backers including Mike Willesee, Basil Sellers, Peter Weinert and Craig Kimberley purchased the licence and bankrolled the club.

Morale at the side plummeted as players were asked to take pay cuts. Legendary coach Tom Hafey was sacked by the club in 1988 after a player-led rebellion at his tough training methods (unusual in the semi-professional days of that era).

Capper was sold to the Brisbane Bears for AUD$400,000 in a desperate attempt to improve the club's finances. Instead, it only led to disastrous on-field performances. Instead of a 100-goal-a-season forward, Sydney's goalkicking was led by Bernard Toohey (usually a defender) with 29 in 1989, then Jim West with 34 in 1990. Players left the club in droves, including Brownlow Medalist Greg Williams, Bernard Toohey and Barry Mitchell. The careers of stars such as Dennis Carroll, David Bolton, Ian Roberts, Tony Morwood and David Murphy wound down, while promising young players like Jamie Lawson, Robert Teal and Paul Bryce had their careers cut short by injury.

Attendances consistently dropped below 10,000 when the team performed poorly between 1990 and 1994. The nadir came with three consecutive wooden spoons in 1992, 1993 and 1994.

In October 1992, members from the 15 AFL clubs voted on axing the struggling Swans. To fill the void left by the Swans, the league floated a radical proposal for Carlton or Collingwood to play all of their away games in Sydney, however it was felt that even the leagues most popular clubs wouldn't be able to draw a sufficient audience in Sydney to cover for the loss of the Swans. The AFL extended an offer for a Tasmanian license which was declined,  and received an offer from the ACTAFL to relocate the club to Canberra, however the AFL rejected this. There were also strong rumours that the AFL intended to merge the club with the Brisbane Bears to form a combined New South Wales/Queensland team, fold altogether, or even move back to South Melbourne. Without adequate alternatives the AFL Commission intead decided to step in and save the club, offering substantial monetary and management support, with the 15 clubs asked to cover the club's AUD$1.2 million annual expenses including license fee and hire of the SCG. With draft and salary cap concessions in the early 1990s and a series of notable recruits, the team became competitive after the early part of the decade.

During this time, the side was largely held together by two inspirational skippers, both from the Wagga Wagga region of country New South Wales, Dennis Carroll and later the courageous captain Paul Kelly.

Desperate to hang on, the club was keen to enlist the biggest names and identities in the AFL, and recruited legendary coach Ron Barassi who helped save the club from extinction while serving them as coach from Round 7, 1993 to 1995. At roughly the same time, Hawthorn legend Dermott Brereton was also recruited, albeit with little on-field impact.

Tony Lockett and grand final return: 1995–2001
A big coup for the club was recruitment of St Kilda Football Club champion Tony "Plugger" Lockett in 1995. Lockett became a cult figure in Sydney, with an instant impact and along with the Super League war in the dominant rival rugby league football code in Australia, helped the Swans to become a powerhouse Sydney icon.

1995 would be Barassi's last year in charge. The Swans won eight games – as many as they did in the previous three seasons combined – and finished with a percentage of over 100. They were also one of only two teams to defeat the all-conquering Carlton side of that year. Captain Paul Kelly won the League's highest individual honour, the Brownlow Medal. Barassi left an improving team, a club in a much better state than he found them.

Former Hawthorn player Rodney Eade took over the reins in 1996 and after a slow start (they lost their first two games of the season), turned the club around into powerful force. The Swans ended the minor round on top of the premiership table with 16 wins, 5 losses and 1 draw. In the finals, the Swans won one of the most thrilling AFL preliminary finals in history after Plugger Lockett kicked a behind after the siren to win the game. The game was played in front of 93,102 at the MCG.

The Swans then made the finals for four of the next five full years that Rodney Eade was in charge. In 1998 they finished 3rd on the AFL ladder; despite beating  in their first final the Swans were then beaten by eventual premiers  in the semi-final at the SCG.

The 1999 season was a largely uneventful year for the club, the only real highlight being Tony Lockett kicking his record-breaking 1300th goal against  in Round 10. The 1999 season ended with a 69-point mauling at the hands of minor premiers .

Rebuilding and finals return: 2002–2004
Former Swans favourite son Paul Roos was appointed caretaker coach midway through the 2002 season, replacing Rodney Eade who was removed after Round 12. Roos won six of the remaining 10 games that year (including the last four of the season) and was installed as the permanent coach from the 2003 season onwards, despite rumors that Sydney had nearly concluded a deal with Terry Wallace.

Roos continued a record as a successful coach with the Swans for the eight full seasons that would follow.

A new home ground in ANZ Stadium (then known as Telstra Stadium) provided increased capacity over the SCG. The Swans' first game played at the Stadium in Round 9, 2002 against  attracted 54,169 spectators. The Sydney Swans v Collingwood match on 23 August 2003 set an attendance record for the largest crowd to watch an AFL game outside of Victoria with an official attendance of 72,393 and was the largest home and away AFL crowd at any stadium for 2003. A preliminary final against the Brisbane Lions in 2003 attracted 71,019 people. The Swans lost all three of those significant matches.

2004 saw an average year for Sydney, however one highlight was when they ended 's undefeated start to the season in Round 11. The match was notable for Leo Barry's effort in nullifying the impact of St Kilda full-forward and eventual Coleman Medallist Fraser Gehrig, whom Barry restricted to only two possessions for the entire match.

Sydney was able to recruit another St Kilda export in the Lockett mould, Barry Hall. There were obvious parallels to the signing of Lockett (a powerful, tough forward from St Kilda with questions over his discipline and attitude), which left Hall with much to live up to. He flourished in his new surroundings and eventually became a cult figure and club leader in his own right.

As the new century dawned, Sydney implemented a policy of giving up high order draft picks in exchange for players who struggled at other clubs. This policy is said to have paid off in the Roos era, as they implemented a strict culture of discipline at the club.

Premiership glory: 2005

In 2005, the Swans came under enormous public scrutiny, even from AFL CEO Andrew Demetriou, for their unorthodox, "boring" defense-oriented tactics that included tightly controlling the tempo of the game and starving the opposition of possession (in fact, seven teams that season had their lowest possession total while playing against the Swans). Swans coach Paul Roos maintained that playing contested football was the style used by all recent Premiership-winning teams, and felt that it was ironic that the much criticised strategy proved ultimately successful.

After finishing third during the regular season, the Swans lost the second qualifying final against the West Coast Eagles at Subiaco Oval on 2 September by 10.5 (65) to 10.9 (69). This dropped them into a semi-final against the Geelong Cats at the SCG on 9 September, and the Swans trailed the Cats 31–53 before Nick Davis kicked four consecutive goals, with the last one a matter of seconds before the siren, to win the game for Sydney by 7.14 (56) to 7.11 (53). In the first preliminary final at the MCG on 16 September against St Kilda, the Swans used a seven-goal blitz in 11 minutes of the fourth quarter to overturn an 8-point deficit and overrun the Saints by 15.6 (96) to 9.11 (65).

The Swans faced the Eagles in a rematch in the AFL Grand Final on 24 September 2005, and this time, they prevailed by four points, final score 8.10 (58) to West Coast's 7.12 (54). In the last few minutes, the Sydney defence held strong, with Leo Barry marking the ball just before the siren to stop the Eagles' final desperate shot at goal. The Premiership was the Swans' first in 72 years and their first since being based in Sydney.

On 30 September 2005, a ticker tape parade down Sydney's George Street was held in honour of the Swans' achievements, which ended with a rally at Sydney Town Hall, where Lord Mayor Clover Moore presented the team with the key to the city. The flag of the Swans also flew on top of the Sydney Harbour Bridge during the week; the same flag was later given to Premier of Western Australia Geoff Gallop to fly on top of the state legislature in Perth as part of the friendly wager between Gallop and Premier of New South Wales Morris Iemma.

Off the field the Grand Final success instigated moves to make the club sustainable in the long term and capitalise on the success to grow the code in the state. The Greater Sydney Australian Football Foundation Limited was formed, which would later become the Sydney Swans Foundation aimed initially at raising $5 million in funds to develop the Swans and the code in New South Wales. The Foundation has raised millions since its inception and helped keep the Swans sustainable in Sydney.

Grand final loss: 2006

As reigning premiers, the Sydney Swans started the 2006 season slowly, losing three of their first four games, including in round one to an  side that would finish near the bottom of the ladder with only three wins and a draw, and finish with the worst defensive record of any side for the season (Sydney, conversely, had the best defensive record of any side).

The 2006 AFL Grand Final was contested between the Sydney Swans and West Coast Eagles at the Melbourne Cricket Ground on 30 September 2006. The West Coast Eagles avenged their 2005 Grand Final defeat by beating the Sydney Swans by one point, only the fourth one-point grand final margin in the competition's history.

The rivalry between the Sydney Swans and West Coast Eagles has become one of the great modern rivalries. The six games between the two sides (from the start of the 2005 finals to the first round of 2007 inclusive) were decided by a combined margin of 13 points. Four of those six games were finals and 2 grand finals.

Finals goal: 2007–2010

It was their earliest exit from the finals since 2001 and was a culmination of a mostly disappointing season, as only victories against lesser teams saw them through to a fifth consecutive finals campaign.

The conclusion of the 2007 trade saw the loss of Adam Schneider and Sean Dempster to St Kilda, the delisting of Simon Phillips, Jonathan Simpkin and Luke Vogels, and the gain of Henry Playfair from Geelong and Martin Mattner from Adelaide.

The Swans spent the middle part of the 2008 season inside the top four, however a late form slump which yielded only three wins in the last nine rounds saw the Swans drop to sixth at the conclusion of the 2008 regular season. Having qualified for the finals for a sixth consecutive season, the Swans defeated  in the elimination final before losing to the Western Bulldogs the following week.

2009 saw the club register only eight victories as they failed to reach the finals for the first time since 2002, finishing 12th with a percentage of below 100% for the first time since 1994. Barry Hall, Leo Barry, Jared Crouch, Michael O'Loughlin, Amon Buchanan and Darren Jolly all departed at the conclusion of the season, with Mark Seaby, Daniel Bradshaw and Shane Mumford, among others, joining the club during the trade period.

The 2010 season saw Sydney return to the finals by virtue of a fifth-place finish at the end of the regular season. The club defeated  by five points in the elimination final before losing to the Western Bulldogs in the semi-finals for the second time in three seasons. The loss signalled the end of the Swans coaching career of Paul Roos as well as that of the playing career of Brett Kirk.

John Longmire era: 2011–present

Former  premiership-winning forward John Longmire took over as coach of the Swans as part of a succession plan initiated by Paul Roos in 2009 prior to the beginning of the 2011 season. He led the club to a seventh-place finish at the end of the regular season, therefore qualifying for the finals for the 13th time in the past 16 seasons.

It was during the regular season that the Swans caused the upset of the season, defeating the star-studded Geelong Cats on its home ground, Skilled Stadium, where the home tenant had won its past 29 games in succession, and its past two matches at the ground by a combined margin of 336 points, in Round 23. It was the Swans' first win over the Cats since 2006 and its first win at the ground since Round 8, 1999. The Swans were also the only team to defeat the West Coast Eagles at Patersons Stadium during the regular season. The Swans' victory over Geelong was overshadowed by the news that co-captain Jarrad McVeigh's baby daughter had died in the week leading up to the match, forcing him to miss that match.

2012: Premiership year, Sydney becomes a two team town

The 2012 season began for the Swans with the inaugural Sydney Derby against AFL newcomers . After an even and physical first half, Sydney went on to win by 63 points. The Swans eventually finished the regular season in third place after losing three of their final four matches, all against their fellow top-four rivals (Collingwood, Hawthorn and Geelong in Rounds 20, 22 and 23 respectively).

The Swans defeated  by 29 points in their qualifying final at AAMI Stadium, thus earning a week off and a home preliminary final, where they then defeated  by 26 points to qualify for their first grand final since 2006, ending an eleven-match losing streak against the Magpies in the process.

In the grand final, the Swans defeated Hawthorn by ten points in front of 99,683 people at the MCG, with Nick Malceski kicking a snap goal with 34 seconds left to seal the Swans' fifth premiership and first since 2005. Ryan O'Keefe was named the Norm Smith Medallist and the Swan's best player in September.

2014–2016: Grand final losses

The 2014 AFL season began with some difficulties for the Swans. Sydney lost their first game against  and then to Collingwood before becoming the first non-South Australian team to win at Adelaide Oval defeating Adelaide by 63 points with Lance Franklin and Luke Parker kicking 4 goals each. After a loss to North Melbourne in Round 4, the Swans' won twelve games in a row, including victories against 2013 grand finalists Fremantle and Hawthorn, Geelong by 110 points at the SCG and then ladder leaders Port Adelaide. In Round 17, the Swans defeated Carlton to match a winning streak set three times in club history, the last of which came way back in 1935, and eventually closed out the season with their first minor premiership in 18 years and a club record 17 wins for the season, eclipsing the previous highest of 16, which was achieved on six past occasions in 2012, 1996, 1986, 1945, 1936 and 1935. In 2014 the Swans were minor premiers, and also qualified for the 2014 AFL Grand Final. They defeated Fremantle at home in the first qualifying final in Round one of the finals series and so earned a one-week break. In the first preliminary final the Swans had a convincing win against North Melbourne, which led them to their fourth grand final in 10 years. The 2014 AFL Grand Final was played on Saturday, 27 September 2014, in near perfect weather conditions, with Sydney seen as favourites leading up to the match. This was the first time in a finals series that former Hawk player Lance Franklin would play against his former team, one of very few players to have played back to back grand finals for two different teams. The Hawks dominated the game quite early and eventually defeated the Swans 11.8.(74) to 21.11.(137). The 63-point loss was Sydney's biggest ever loss in a grand final and their biggest defeat all season, meaning Hawthorn would become back to back premiers for the second time in their history.

The Swans started the 2015 AFL season well, winning their first three, before losing their next two games against Fremantle, where they trailed by as many as 8 goals before half-time, and the Western Bulldogs. They won their next 6 leading into the bye, including home wins against Geelong and North Melbourne, and an upset away win against Hawthorn in the grand final replay. The Swans lost their first game after the bye, their 3rd of the season to Richmond at the SCG, 11.11 (77) to 14.11. (95). The Swans rebounded with unconvincing wins against Port Adelaide and Brisbane Lions, before suffering their heaviest defeat for 17 seasons against the Hawks by 89 points. The following week was no better with a road trip to Perth and another loss, this time to the Eagles by 52 points, the scoreline ultimately flattering the Swans. The Swans bounced back against Adelaide with a convincing win 52-point win, but lost their next game to Geelong at Simmonds stadium; a close affair that Geelong blew apart in the 3rd quarter.

The Swans faced minor premiers Fremantle in the first qualifying final, their first finals match without Franklin, who had withdrawn from the finals due to illness. Ultimately the Swans would go down in a low-scoring affair, effectively kicking themselves out of the game after losing Sam Reid to a hamstring injury midway through the 2nd quarter. The following week the Swans were knocked out of the finals in a one-sided contest against North Melbourne, struggling to score throughout the first half with the game effectively over by half-time. For the first time since 2011, the Swans failed to make a preliminary final.

The Swans' continued period of success, in which it has missed the finals only three times since 1995, has led to some criticism about a salary cap concession which the club receives; the concession is in the form of an additional Cost of Living Allowance (COLA), due to the higher cost of living in Sydney compared with any other Australian city. It was, however, announced in March 2014 that this allowance would be scrapped. The trade ban was fought by the club before the 2015 season and a reprieve was won, with the AFL allowing the club to participate in the 2015 AFL draft. There was a catch however, with the league imposing an edict that the club could only recruit players at or below current average wage of $340,000 (adjusted figures for 2015 was $349,000). During the 2015 season, with the Swans team stretched by aging players and injuries, it had become apparent that the trade restrictions that had prevented the Swans from participating in the 2014 draft, had impacted the list. With the trade period looming, Andrew Pridham lobbied the AFL to lift the trade restrictions, labeling the ban as a restraint of trade. In response to continued discussions between the club and league, as well as lobbying by the AFLPA, the league further relaxed the trade restrictions for the Swans during the 2015 AFL Finals. The AFL changed the sanctions so that the Swans could replace a player that leaves the club as either a free agent, or through trade, with another player on a contract up to $450,000 per year. This allowed the Swans to trade for Callum Sinclair in a swap deal, as well as trade a late pick for out-of-contract defender, Michael Talia from the Western Bulldogs.

The Swans started off the 2016 season with a convincing 80-point round 1 win against Collingwood, with new Swans recruit Michael Talia suffering a long-term foot injury. They followed up the next round with a 60-point win against the Blues, with new recruit Callum Sinclair kicking 3 goals. The following week they defeated GWS by 25 points, with Lance Franklin kicking 4 goals. In the following match against the Crows, Isaac Heeney starred with 18 touches and 4 goals in a losing side. Three more wins followed, against West Coast, Brisbane and Essendon respectively before a shock loss to Richmond in round 8 by a solitary point, after a kick after the siren. They bounced back to win against top spot North Melbourne, and the Hawks at the MCG, with Lance Franklin booting 3 goals, including a bomb from 80 metres. After a tight slog against the Suns, the Swans played the Giants once more and were defeated in the club's 100th game. They won their next game by 55 points against the Demons, in a fourth quarter breeze. After a bye in Round 14, the Sydney Swans lost their first game after, again with the last kick of the game, by 4 points. The week after was soured by a family feud involving co-captain Kieren Jack and his parents, after they were reportedly told by him not to come to is 200-game milestone. After the spat, Jack led the Swans to an emphatic upset victory against Geelong, booting 3 goals and gathering 24 possessions in the one-sided 38-point victory at Simonds Stadium. They then travelled back home where they faced Hawthorn and lost their 3rd match of the season by under a goal, as Buddy went goalless for the first time in the season. After an unconvincing win the following week against Carlton, the Swans went on to win their last 5 home and away games by a combined total of 349 points, giving them top spot and a home qualifying final.

Ahead of their first final against cross-town rivals the Giants, the Swans confirmed that they would play all home finals at the SCG except for Sydney Derbies, which would be played at ANZ Stadium. The final would create history, being the first Sydney Derby to be played in a final. It was also the first time that the Giants would make the finals in their fifth year. In a low-scoring first half, the Swans were very competitive, trailing by only 2 points. However, a mark not paid to Isaac Heeney midway through the third quarter turned all the momentum the Giants way, as they kicked away to win by 36 points. The Swans only kicked 2 goals after half-time with Giant Jeremy Cameron outscoring them in the third quarter alone with 3 goals. They were quick to bounce back the following week, thumping the Adelaide Crows by 6 goals, with Franklin and Tom Papley kicking 4 goals a piece, after a blistering 7 goal to 1 quarter. The story was pretty much the same in the preliminary final against the Geelong Cats at the MCG. The Swans kept the Cats goalless for the first quarter, and were never really challenged in their 37-point triumph. It would take them to their third grand final in five years, against the Western Bulldogs at the MCG. After leading by a scant 2-point margin at half time, the Bulldogs pulled away towards the end of the fourth quarter to hand Sydney their second grand final loss in three years.

The Swans began the 2017 season with six straight losses, after being upset at home by Port Adelaide in the opening round, they were upset by Collingwood and Carlton, and suffered defeats to the Western Bulldogs, Greater Western Sydney (who won their first game at the SCG) and West Coast Eagles (in Perth). However, they managed to win 13 of their last 15, losing both their games to Hawthorn by 1 goal. Some of their best wins include against the reigning premiers the Bulldogs, GWS, and comeback wins against Richmond and Essendon. After becoming the first grand-finalist to lose their first six games, they have become the first team to reach the finals after starting the season 0–6. They would comprehensively defeat Essendon in their first final, before slumping to an ugly defeat against Geelong, ending their season.

The Swans had an indifferent 2018, compounded by their struggles at home, losing 5 out of 11 games at the SCG. A lean patch of form which included upset losses to Gold Coast (for the first time ever) and Essendon (for the first time since 2011) had them looking likely to miss finals altogether; however, three out of four wins in the last four rounds was enough to see them into their ninth consecutive finals series, where they were comprehensively beaten by GWS in the Elimination Final.

The Swans' golden era of finals appearances came to an end in 2019. They missed the finals for the first time in a decade, finishing 15th on the ladder with eight wins and 14 losses. They started the season poorly with just one win in their first seven matches, although they would briefly recover after winning five of the next seven games. Six losses on the trot ended any chance of a tenth consecutive finals appearance, but strong wins over also-rans Melbourne and St Kilda in the final two rounds ensured the season ended on a positive note.

2020s: Return to finals

They won their first match of the interrupted 2020 season against Adelaide at the Adelaide Oval by three points, but won only four more games for the season, missing the finals in consecutive seasons for the first time since 1994–95. The 16th-place finish was also the lowest in club history.

After two seasons out of the finals, the Swans rebounded to great effect in 2021. An excellent first month of the season, which saw them upset Brisbane and reigning premiers Richmond, set up a strong home-and-away campaign. Seven wins in their final eight games saw Sydney secure sixth position with a 15–7 win-loss record, just percentage outside the top four, but their year came to a premature end in the finals after a heartbreaking one-point loss to crosstown rival Greater Western Sydney in the second elimination final. The players felt as though they had more to give, and were overcome with disappointment knowing that they had no finals win to show for it, in a season which had otherwise been a massive step in the right direction. 

In 2022, the Swans backed up their meteoric rise up the ladder with another promising start, winning five of their first six matches. This included a 30-point win against Geelong in Round 2, which involved Lance Franklin kicking his 1000th career goal, sparking one of the biggest pitch invasions in AFL history. After a mid-year slump, in which the Swans lost winnable games against Gold Coast, Port Adelaide and Essendon, they finished the home-and-away season with seven wins in a row, securing a top-4 berth for the first time since 2016. 

In the 2022 finals series, the Swans beat Melbourne by 22 points at the Melbourne Cricket Ground to lock in a home preliminary final. The Swans played Collingwood in the preliminary final and won by a single point, qualifying to play in their fourth grand final in 12 years under Longmire.

On 24 September, the Swans were defeated by Geelong by 133 points to 52 in the 2022 AFL Grand Final.

Club identity
The club's on-field nickname, the Swans, was suggested by a Herald and Weekly Times artist in 1933, was inspired by the number of Western Australians in the team (the black swan being the state emblem of Western Australia), and was formally adopted by the club before the following season 1934. The Chicago Swans are affiliated with the club and share a similar logo.

Uniforms
The jumper is white with a red back and a red yoke with a silhouette of the Sydney Opera House at the point of the yoke. The Opera House design was first used at the start of the 1987 season, replacing the traditional red "V" on white design. Until 1991, the back of the jumper was white with the yoke only extending to the back of the shoulders and each side of the jumper had a red vertical stripe. The current predominantly red design appeared at the start of the 1992 season. The club's major sponsor is QBE Insurance. In 2004 the club added the initials 'SMFC' in white lettering at the back of the collar to honour the club's past as South Melbourne Football Club. The move was welcomed by Melbourne-based fans. The clash guernsey is a predominantly white version of the home guernsey similar to the original Opera House guernsey design, including a white back, but it is rarely used, since the two Queensland clubs (the Brisbane Lions and Gold Coast Suns) and cross town rivals GWS Giants are the only clubs with which there is a clash.

Nike is the current manufacturer of the Swans' apparel. Previous manufacturers were Puma (from mid-1990s to 2009) and ISC (2010 to 2020).

Evolution

Club song
The club song is known as Cheer, Cheer The Red and The White and is to the tune of the Victory March, the fight song of the Notre Dame Fighting Irish in South Bend, Indiana, USA, which was written by University of Notre Dame graduates and brothers Rev. Michael J. Shea and John F. Shea. In 1961, SMFC committee member Mr. Lynn Laurence sought and was granted a copyright from the University and other musical houses to adapt and add lyrics to the Victory March thus creating the new club song, which replaced an adaptation of Springtime in the Rockies by Gene Autry. Port Adelaide also has used the Victory March as the basis for their club song since 1971, though their senior team changed their club song to their current original Power To Win after their entry into the AFL.

George Gershwin's Swanee (1919) was used by the club in marketing promotions during the late 1990s.

In March 2021, the Swans made a slight but inclusive change to the penultimate line of their club song, with the words "while her loyal sons are marching..." changing to "while our loyal Swans are marching...".

Home ground and training base

The club's original home ground was Lakeside Oval, when they were known as the South Melbourne Football Club 
from 1879 until 1981.

Since the 2016 AFL season, the Swans have played all their home games at the Sydney Cricket Ground, a 48,000 capacity venue located in inner-east suburb of Moore Park. The venue has been home to Swans home games since the club's relocation to Sydney in 1982. In the years 2002–2015, the Swans played between three and four home matches per season and most home finals matches at Stadium Australia (commercially known as ANZ Stadium), an 80,000 capacity stadium located in the west of the city. During the first five years at the ground average crowds were high, but issues with the surface as well as fan and player disengagement resulted in the club ending its association with the venue.

The club also trains on the SCG during the season and had its indoor training facilities and offices located within the stadium. During the off-season, when the ground is configured for cricket, the Swans train on the adjacent Tramway Oval (previously known as Lakeside Oval) also located within the Moore Park precinct. The oval is located less than one hundred metres from the SCG and since undergoing a redevelopment in 2018/19, has the same dimensions as the Docklands Stadium in Melbourne. The Swans NEAFL/reserves team have played some home matches at the oval, which has grassed hills and standing areas for several hundred spectators.

In October 2018 the club announced it would shift all offices and indoor training facilities to Moore Park's Royal Hall of Industries sometime in the early-to-mid 2020s, after announcing a $55 million deal with the New South Wales Government to redevelop the Hall. The club pulled out of the agreement in April 2020 due to the financial implications of the COVID-19 pandemic. In August 2021, the Swans announced it had re-negotiated a lease with the government to immediately commence the project. The facility provides indoor training facilities and administration for the Swans AFL, VFL and AFLW teams. The club began moving into the facility in December 2022.

Rivalries

Greater Western Sydney

The introduction of the GWS Giants to the AFL in 2012 resulted in the formation of the Sydney Derby. The Swans compete against their cross-city rivals twice every season. The best performed player from every derby match is awarded the Brett Kirk Medal.

Initially, the rivalry was a one-sided affair in favour of the Swans, who won 8 of the first 9 derbies. However, it has become more competitive in recent years, with the Giants winning 5 of the 7 most recent derbies. The Swans have also played the Giants in three finals matches, losing each time.

West Coast Eagles

The Swans developed a famous modern rivalry against the Perth-based West Coast Eagles between 2005 and 2007, when six consecutive games between the two teams, including two qualifying finals and two grand finals, were decided by less than a goal. The rivalry was highlighted by Sydney's four-point win against West Coast in the 2005 Grand Final, and West Coast's one-point win against Sydney in the 2006 Grand Final.

Hawthorn
The rivalry with Hawthorn has been more recent, mostly defined by two grand finals (2012 and 2014). The Swans beat Hawthorn in 2012 by 10 points to claim their fifth premiership. The rivalry grew in 2013, when Hawthorn forward Lance Franklin transferred to the Swans as a free agent on a nine-year, $10 million deal. In 2014, the Swans finished minor premiers and were favourites to win the grand final, however Hawthorn beat Sydney by 63 points. Both teams have had close games since their grand final encounters, with their matches often finishing within single digit margins.

Men's team
Current squad

Women's team
Current squad

Reserves

The Swans has fielded its reserves team in the Victorian Football League from 2021. The team plays the majority of its home matches at Tramway Oval, and some as curtain raisers to the senior team.

Previously, a reserves team was first created for South Melbourne in 1919, initially in the form of the Leopold Football Club, which was the leading junior club in the district and which had won five Metropolitan Junior Football Association premierships in its history. The team played as Leopold until 1924, then changed its name to the South Melbourne Second Eighteen in 1925. The club's seconds (and later, reserves) team, competed in the VFL reserves and its successor, the Victorian State Football League, until that competition's demise at the end of 1999 – despite the club having moved to Sydney in 1982. The team enjoyed little success in the Victorian competition; it was the only reserves team never to win a premiership, and its best performances were losing grand finals in 1927, 1956, 1980 and 1995.

In 2000, the Swans reserves team – known as the Redbacks – joined the Sydney AFL competition, but was so dominant in the lower competition that it withdrew prior to the finals series because the club felt the difference in standard was too greatly in favour of the Swans. Between 2001 and 2002 the Swans affiliated themselves with the Port Melbourne Football Club in the VFL, sending most of its reserves players there, while also retaining the Redbacks in the Sydney AFL as a junior development team – which was more suited to the level of competition, but had limited onfield success. Then, from 2003 until 2010, the Sydney reserves recombined to a single team, which contested the higher standard AFL Canberra, winning four consecutive premierships between 2005 and 2008.

In 2011 the Swans reserves team joined the newly established North East Australian Football League with the rest of the AFL Canberra competition, and was able to play regular matches against other AFL reserves teams from the Brisbane Lions, Gold Coast Suns and GWS Giants. The team played home games at the Sydney Cricket Ground and will often play as a curtain raiser to senior AFL games. The team was almost always competitive but never won a premiership, eliminated in the Eastern Conference Grand Finals in 2011 and 2012; then losing the overall NEAFL grand final five times: 2013, 2014, 2016, 2017 and 2018.

Corporate

AdministrationDirectors:
 Andrew Pridham chairman (2013–present)
 Andrew Ireland
 Sam Mostyn
 Robert Morgan
 Greg Paramor
 Darren Steinberg
 Leo Barry
 Alexandra Goodfellow
 Brian TysonCEOs:
 Tom Harley (2018- Current)
 Andrew Ireland (2009-2018)
 Myles Baron-Hay (2004–2009)
 Phil Mullen
 Colin Seery
 Kelvin Templeton
 Jordan Sembel

Supported charities
Wally Jackson Research Fund
 Sydney Australian Football Foundation (SAFF)

Supporter base

Although a large majority of the existing fan base strongly objected to the relocation of the club from South Melbourne, the Sydney Swans have built a large following in the city they now call home. Attendances and memberships in Sydney grew dramatically during the Lockett era, helped out by the Super League War plaguing Rugby League. Nevertheless, the Swans continue to have a substantial supporter base in Victoria, with attendances for Swans games in Melbourne being much higher than other non-Victorian teams.

According to Roy Morgan Research, the club has been the most supported club among all AFL supporters in every year since 2004.Legend: Premiers    Grand Finalist  Finals   Wooden spoon

Club honour boards
Honour board

Team of the century
Sydney announced its team of the century on 8 August 2003:

Hall of fame

Achievements
Club achievements

Individual achievementsBob Skilton Medal (Club best and fairest)Brownlow Medal (League best and fairest) Herbie Matthews – 1940
 Ron Clegg – 1949
 Fred Goldsmith – 1955
 Bob Skilton – 1959, 1963, 1968
 Peter Bedford – 1970
 Graham Teasdale – 1977
 Barry Round – 1981
 Greg Williams – 1986
 Gerard Healy – 1988
 Paul Kelly – 1995
 Adam Goodes – 2003, 2006Norm Smith Medal (AFL Grand Final best on ground) Ryan O'Keefe – 2012Leigh Matthews Trophy (AFLPA Most Valuable Player) Gerard Healy – 1988Coleman Medal (Leading Goal Kicker)Tony Lockett – 1996, 1998
Lance Franklin – 2014, 2017AFL Rising Star (Best player under 21)Adam Goodes – 1999
Dan Hannebery – 2010
Callum Mills – 2016

 Records 
 Most games – Adam Goodes (372)
 Most goals – Bob Pratt (681)
 Most goals in match – Tony Lockett (16), Round 19, 1995 v Fitzroy at Western Oval
 Most goals in a season – Bob Pratt (150) in 1934
 Most games coached – John Longmire (258)
 Highest score – 36.20 (236) vs Essendon 11.7 (73), Round 17, 1987
 Lowest score – South Melbourne 0.5 (5) vs Carlton 3.6 (24), Round 8, 1899
 Lowest score since 1919 – South Melbourne 1.9 (15) vs Geelong 8.9 (57), Round 16, 1964
 Highest losing score – South Melbourne 24.10 (154) vs Melbourne 24.23 (167), Round 1, 1979
 Lowest winning score – South Melbourne 2.3 (15) vs Melbourne 1.7 (13), Round 6, 1898
 Lowest winning score since 1919 – South Melbourne 4.15 (39) vs Fitzroy 4.12 (36), Round 4, 1919
 Since 1920 – South Melbourne 5.11 (41) vs St. Kilda 5.9 (39), Round 16, 1948
 Greatest Winning Margin – (171 points) – South Melbourne 29.15 (189) vs St. Kilda 2.6 (18), Round 12, 1919
 Greatest Losing Margin' – (165 points) – South Melbourne 2.7 (19) vs Essendon 28.16 (184), Round 18, 1964

See also

 Australian rules football in New South Wales
 Sport in Australia
 Sport in New South Wales

Notes

References

External links

 

 
Australian Football League clubs
Australian rules football clubs established in 1874
Australian rules football clubs in Sydney
Former Victorian Football League clubs
1874 establishments in Australia
Sports team relocations